Balaguier-d'Olt (literally Balaguier of Olt) is a commune in the Aveyron department in the Occitanie region of southern France.

The inhabitants of the commune are known as Balaguiérois or Balaguiéroises.

Geography
Balaguier-d'Olt is located some 12 km south-west of Figeac just east of Ambeyrac. The whole north-western border of the commune is the Lot river which is also the departmental boundary between Aveyron and Lot. Access to the commune is by the D86 road from Ambeyrac which follows the river through the village and continues north-east to Capdenac-Gare. The D38 branches off the D86 and crosses the only bridge in the commune across the Lot to Saint-Pierre-Toirac. The D647 branches off the D86 just north of the village and goes south-east to Foissac. Apart from the village there is the hamlet of Vernet-le-Bas in the north of the commune. The commune is mixed forest and farmland.

Geologically the commune is divided into two parts: first the Lot valley which consists of Toarcian marl and secondly the limestone plateau overlooking it.

The Ruisseau de Bournac flows from the north-east and the Ruisseau de Fréjéroque flows from the east both joining in the commune and flowing into the Lot.

Neighbouring communes and villages

Administration

List of Successive Mayors

Demography
In 2017 the commune had 162 inhabitants.

Sites and Monuments
The Romanesque Church of Vernet-le-Bas has a bell tower dating from the 12th century and has Romanesque capitals on three sides. Inside the church the Romanesque Altar (12th century) is still preserved in one of the side chapels. It is carved in sandstone decorations and presents interlacing. It is registered as an historical object.

See also
Communes of the Aveyron department

Bibliography
Christian-Pierre Bedel (preface Jacques Dournes), Capdenac Los Aures Asprièras, Balaguier, Bolhac, Causse-e-Diege Foissac, Naussac, Salas, Sonnac / Christian-Pierre Bedel e los estatjants del canton de Capdenac, Rodez, Mission departmental culture, coll. "Al Canton", 1996, ill., cov. ill., 28 cm, 240  pp. , ISSN 1151-8375, BNF No. FRBNF36688708

External links
Balaguier-d'Olt on Géoportail, National Geographic Institute (IGN) website 
Balaguyer on the 1750 Cassini Map

References

Communes of Aveyron